Chahar Qollat (also Romanized as Chahār Qollāt) is a village in Aliabad-e Malek Rural District, in the Central District of Arsanjan County, Fars Province, Iran. At the 2006 census, its population was 305, in 68 families.

References 

Populated places in Arsanjan County